Micropholis macrophylla is a species of plant in the family Sapotaceae. It is endemic to Peru.

References

Trees of Peru
macrophylla
Critically endangered plants
Taxonomy articles created by Polbot